Depressaria subnervosa is a moth in the family Depressariidae. It was described by Charles Oberthür in 1888. It is found in Algeria.

References

Moths described in 1888
Depressaria
Moths of Africa